Alekseyevka, Azerbaijan may refer to:
Alekseyevka, Agstafa
Alekseyevka, Khachmaz
Alekseyevka, Quba